Matteo Pallecchi (born 9 February 2000) is an Italian football player. He plays for Arzachena.

Club career
He made his Serie B debut for Livorno on 23 November 2019 in a game against Trapani. He substituted Filip Raičević in the 79th minute. Pallecchi currently plays as a midfielder.

On 26 August 2021, he signed with Arzachena in Serie D.

References

External links
 
 

2000 births
Sportspeople from the Province of Livorno
Footballers from Tuscany
Living people
Italian footballers
Association football forwards
U.S. Livorno 1915 players
Serie B players
Serie C players
Serie D players
People from Cecina, Tuscany
21st-century Italian people